Stevan Nedić (1875–1923), nicknamed Ćela (Ћела), was a Serbian Chetnik commander in Old Serbia and Macedonia.

Life
Nedić was born in 1875, in the village of Strugovo near Bitola, in the Ottoman Empire (now R. Macedonia). He received his nickname Ćela (slang for "head"), due to his Typhoid fever that left marks on his head. He joined the Bulgarian-organized Internal Macedonian Revolutionary Organization (IMRO) as a fighter in the bands of Georgi Sugarev and Gligor Sokolović. In 1902 he befriended Milorad Gođevac, the founder of the Serbian Chetnik Organization. He participated in the Ilinden Uprising. He joined the Serbian Chetniks in 1903, and in 1905 he and Jovan Babunski cross the Vardar for the Veles region. He participated in the battles of Fight on Čelopek (1905), Oreških Livada and Borba na Kurtovom kamenu near Krapa (1906). He was an active fighter in the Balkan Wars and the First World War (1912–18), then after the Serbian liberation he became a municipality president in his home village, a post he held until his murder. He was murdered in 1923 by a Bulgarian nationalist agent.

See also
 List of Chetnik voivodes

References

Sources

Народна енциклопедија српско-хрватско словеначка, Београд 1929, књига 4, 655.

1875 births
1923 deaths
19th-century Serbian people
20th-century Serbian people
Serbian military leaders
People from Bitola
Assassinated Serbian people
Chetniks of the Macedonian Struggle
Serbian military personnel of the Balkan Wars
Serbian military personnel of World War I
Royal Serbian Army soldiers
Serbs of North Macedonia